Darvaz (also Romanized as Darvāz; also known as Darvāzeh) is a village in Kamal Rud Rural District, Qolqol Rud District, Tuyserkan County, Hamadan Province, Iran. At the 2006 census, its population was 101, in 29 families.

References 

Populated places in Tuyserkan County